Ramna or Râmna may refer to:

Ramna Thana, a neighborhood in Dhaka, Bangladesh
Ramna Park, a public park in the neighborhood
Ramna Kali Mandir, an extinct Hindu temple in the park
Ramna Sharma, an entrepreneur from India
rivers in Romania:
Râmna, a tributary of the Lotru in Vâlcea County
Râmna (Putna), a tributary of the Putna in Vrancea County